Ansan Wa~ Stadium is a multi-purpose stadium in Ansan, Gyeonggi-do, South Korea. It's currently served as home stadium for Ansan Greeners FC. The stadium was opened in 2007 and has a capacity of 35,000 people. It is used mostly for football matches and athletics. It is located next to Gojan Station on Seoul Subway Line 4.

While under construction it was known as "Ansan Stadium". After the public subscription during the construction, the formal name "Ansan Wa~ Stadium" was selected. "Wa" means harmonious cheering and the wave notation (~) represents the extension of that sound. 2013 HSBC Asia 5 countries football game was held in the stadium.

References

External links
 Ansan Wa~ Stadium 
 Worldstadiums profile
 Soccerway profile

Danwon-gu
Football venues in South Korea
Rugby union stadiums in South Korea
Multi-purpose stadiums in South Korea
Sports venues in Gyeonggi Province
Buildings and structures in Ansan
Venues of the 2014 Asian Games
Sports venues completed in 2007
2007 establishments in South Korea
K League 2 stadiums